The S10 is a railway service that runs every half-hour between  and  in the Swiss canton of Ticino. Treni Regionali Ticino Lombardia (TILO), a joint venture of Swiss Federal Railways and Trenord, operates the service.

Operations 

History 
It was again extended Albate-Camerlata in December 2015, and then cut back to Como San Giovanni in September 2018.

The opening of the Ceneri Base Tunnel transformed regional services in Ticino. On 5 April 2021, the S10 and S50 began using the tunnel and bypassing all local stops between Giubiasco and Lugano. The northern terminus moved from Bellinzona to Biasca.

References

External links 

 Official site

Rail transport in Ticino
Transport in Lombardy